Du Bocage is a historic house at 1115 West 4th Street in Pine Bluff, Arkansas.  It is a two-story wood-frame structure, with a side gable roof and weatherboard siding.  A two-story gabled section projects from the center of the front, supported by large Greek Revival columns, with a balustraded porch on the second level.  The house was built in 1866 by Joseph Bocage, a veteran of the American Civil War, using lumber from the land and milled by his own mills.  Bocage was a prominent local businessman, who owned a brick manufactory and a steam engine production plant in the city.

The house was listed on the National Register of Historic Places in 1974.

See also
National Register of Historic Places listings in Jefferson County, Arkansas

References

Greek Revival architecture in Arkansas
Houses completed in 1866
Houses in Pine Bluff, Arkansas
Houses on the National Register of Historic Places in Arkansas
National Register of Historic Places in Pine Bluff, Arkansas
Victorian architecture in Arkansas